Amanita submembranacea is a species of fungi belonging to the family Amanitaceae.

It is native to Europe and Northern America.

References

submembranacea